Victor is the largest city in Teton County, Idaho, United States. The population was 2,157 at the 2020 census, up from 1,928 in 2010, and 840 from 2000. It is part of the Jackson, WY–ID Micropolitan Statistical Area.

Nearby Teton Pass is accessed south from Victor on State Highway 33, which continues east of the state border as Wyoming Highway 22 to Jackson Hole.

History
Victor was established in 1889 from four existing settlements, namely Trail Creek, Fox Creek, Chapin and Cedron. It was named for George Victor Sherwood, a dedicated mail carrier who delivered the mail despite threats of attacks.

Geography

The zip code for Victor is 83455.

Highways
 - SH-31
 - SH-33

Demographics

2020 census 
At the 2020 census there were 2,157 people in 1,128 households in the city. There were 1,012 housing units. 

The median age was 32.3 years. 27.9% of residents were under the age of 18. 7.1% were between the ages of 18 and 24; 36.1% were from 25 to 44; 21.4% were from 45 to 65; 7.7% were 65 or older.

2010 census
At the 2010 census there were 1,928 people in 683 households, including 433 families, in the city. The racial makeup of the city was 79.3% White, 0.5% Black (U.S. Census), 1.0% Native American, 0.5% Asian, 0.1% Pacific Islander, 16.9% from other races, and 1.9% from two or more races. Hispanic or Latino of any race were 22.6%.

Of the 683 households 41.9% had children under the age of 18 living with them, 53.7% were married couples living together, 6.1% had a female householder with no husband present, 3.5% had a male householder with no wife present, and 36.6% were non-families. 24.0% of households were one person and 4.1% were one person aged 65 or older. The average household size was 2.82 and the average family size was 3.51.

The median age was 30.6 years. 31.5% of residents were under the age of 18; 6.5% were between the ages of 18 and 24; 43.3% were from 25 to 44; 15.1% were from 45 to 64; and 3.7% were 65 or older. The gender makeup of the city was 52.4% male and 47.6% female.

2000 census
At the 2000 census there were 840 people in 293 households, including 205 families, in the city. The racial makeup of the city was 91.31% White, 0.71% Black (U.S. Census), 1.55% Native American, 4.76% from other races, and 1.67% from two or more races. Hispanic or Latino of any race were 10.71%.

Of the 293 households 39.6% had children under the age of 18 living with them, 57.3% were married couples living together, 7.5% had a female householder with no husband present, and 29.7% were non-families. 22.2% of households were one person and 6.5% were one person aged 65 or older. The average household size was 2.87 and the average family size was 3.43.

The age distribution was 31.5% under the age of 18, 6.9% from 18 to 24, 37.5% from 25 to 44, 16.3% from 45 to 64, and 7.7% 65 or older. The median age was 31 years. For every 100 females, there were 105.9 males. For every 100 females age 18 and over, there were 104.6 males.

The median household income was $42,500 and the median family income was $49,750. Males had a median income of $37,159 versus $25,250 for females. The per capita income for the city was $16,740. About 7.0% of families and 8.4% of the population were below the poverty line, including 11.2% of those under age 18 and 7.0% of those age 65 or over.

Climate
According to the Köppen climate classification, Victor has a warm-summer humid continental climate (Dfb).

Education
The public schools in the county are operated by Teton School District #401, headquartered in Driggs. The only traditional high school is Teton High School, also in Driggs. A lower elementary school (K–3) is in Victor, but the district's upper elementary (4–5) and middle school (6–8) are located in Driggs.

References

External links
 
 
 Teton Valley Chamber of Commerce
 Teton School District #401
 City-Data.com - Victor, Idaho

Cities in Teton County, Idaho
Cities in Idaho
Jackson, Wyoming micropolitan area